Anna-Lena Forster (born 15 June 1995) is a German para-alpine skier who competed at the 2014, 2018 and 2022 Winter Paralympics winning six medals.

Early life
Forster was born in Radolfzell, Konstanz Germany. She was born without a right leg and with bones missing in her left leg. She started skiing at the age of six at the VDK Munchen ski club.

Career
Forster competes in the LW12 para-alpine skiing classification using a mono-ski and outriggers.

At the 2013 IPC Alpine Skiing World Championships, she won a silver medal in the women's slalom in a time of 2 minutes 31.31 seconds. She was also placed fourth in the super-combined and fifth in the super-G but she failed to finish the giant slalom.

Forster was selected as part of the German team for the 2014 Winter Paralympics in Sochi, Russia. Competing in the slalom she finished in a time of 2 minutes 14.35 seconds and was identified as the gold medal winner and press releases announcing her victory were posted. She was given gold because her compatriot Anna Schaffelhuber, who finished in a faster time, was disqualified for not having her outriggers in a stationary position at the start of her first run. Following an appeal Schaffelhuber was reinstated and Forster was awarded the silver medal. Forster won her second silver medal of the Games, again finishing behind Schaffelhuber, in the combined. The two German skiers were the only athletes to complete the race. Her third Paralympic medal, a bronze, came in the giant slalom where she finished behind Schaffelhuber and Austrian skier Claudia Lösch in a time of 2 minutes 59.33 seconds. In the downhill Forster came fourth and therefore missed out on a medal. She failed to finish the super-G event.

Forster was nominated for the Baden Sports Personality of the Year award in 2012 and in 2013 she was awarded a gold medal by her home town of Radolfzell to mark her achievements.

She won the silver medal in the women's downhill sitting event at the 2022 Winter Paralympics.

References

External links 
 
 

1995 births
Living people
German female alpine skiers
Paralympic alpine skiers of Germany
Paralympic gold medalists for Germany
Paralympic silver medalists for Germany
Paralympic bronze medalists for Germany
Paralympic medalists in alpine skiing
Alpine skiers at the 2014 Winter Paralympics
Alpine skiers at the 2018 Winter Paralympics
Alpine skiers at the 2022 Winter Paralympics
Medalists at the 2014 Winter Paralympics
Medalists at the 2018 Winter Paralympics
Medalists at the 2022 Winter Paralympics
People from Radolfzell
Sportspeople from Freiburg (region)
21st-century German women